Romance Theatre is a 30-minute American anthology television series produced for first-run syndication by Courtship Productions. A total of 83 episodes aired from 1982–83.  The show was hosted by Louis Jourdan.  Guest stars included Millie Perkins, Doris Roberts, Annie Potts, Janis Paige, Lyle Waggoner, and Chuck Woolery.

References

External links

1980s American anthology television series
1982 American television series debuts
1983 American television series endings
First-run syndicated television programs in the United States